Montri Puanglib (born March 24, 1990) is a member of the Thailand men's national volleyball team He is nicknamed Tri.

Career 
Montri won the gold medal in the 2015 Southeast Asian Games.

Clubs 
  Suphan Buri VC (2009–2010)
  Nakhon Sawan VC (2011–2012)
  Suan Dusit (2012–2014)
  Ratchaburi (2015–2017)
  Phitsanulok (2017–2018)
  Saraburi (2018)
  Asia GS Samutsakorn (2020–)

Awards

Individual 
 2012–13 Thailand League "Best Receiver"
 2012–13 Thailand League "Best Libero"

Clubs 
 2009–10 Thailand League -  Bronze medal, with Suphan Buri VC
 2011–12 Thailand League -  Bronze medal, with Nakhon Sawan VC
 2016–17 Thailand League -  Bronze medal, with Ratchaburi
 2017–18 Thailand League -  Third, with Phitsanulok
 2018–19 Thailand League -  Runner-Up, with Saraburi
 2019 Thai–Denmark Super League -  Third, with Saraburi

References

1990 births
Living people
Montri Puanglib
Montri Puanglib
Volleyball players at the 2014 Asian Games
Volleyball players at the 2018 Asian Games
Montri Puanglib
Southeast Asian Games medalists in volleyball
Competitors at the 2013 Southeast Asian Games
Competitors at the 2015 Southeast Asian Games
Competitors at the 2017 Southeast Asian Games
Montri Puanglib
Competitors at the 2019 Southeast Asian Games
Montri Puanglib
Liberos
Montri Puanglib